Thomas Cavanaugh (born May 10, 1869) was an American sailor serving in the United States Navy during the Spanish–American War who received the Medal of Honor for bravery.

Biography

Medal of Honor citation
Rank and organization: Fireman First Class, U.S. Navy. Born: 10 May 1869, Ireland. Accredited to: New York. G.O. No.: 503, 12 December 1898.

Citation:

On board the U.S.S. Potomac during the passage of that vessel from Cat Island to Nassau, 14 November 1898. Volunteering to enter the fireroom which was filled with steam, Cavanaugh, after repeated attempts, succeeded in reaching the auxiliary valve and opening it, thereby relieving the vessel from further danger.

See also

List of Medal of Honor recipients for the Spanish–American War

References

External links

1869 births
19th-century Irish people
Irish sailors in the United States Navy
Year of death missing
United States Navy Medal of Honor recipients
United States Navy sailors
People from North Dakota
Irish emigrants to the United States (before 1923)
American military personnel of the Spanish–American War
Irish-born Medal of Honor recipients
Spanish–American War recipients of the Medal of Honor